The Pennsylvania Memorial is a war memorial in Varennes-en-Argonne, France dedicated to volunteers from Pennsylvania who participated in the First World War. The memorial is constructed in a Greek style and the viewing platform gives a view of the Aire valley. The memorial was designed by architects Thomas H. Atherton and Paul Philippe Cret. It was erected by the Commonwealth of Pennsylvania, via the Pennsylvania Monuments Commission, in 1927.

Design
The memorial is located on the grounds of a former chateau and Saint-Gengoult de Varennes church, both destroyed between 1640-1642. The memorial is done is a neoclassical style, it is made of stone and white marble. Two peristyles on square columns surround an esplanade, in the centre of which is a pedestal with a bronze basin resting on a tripod decorated with Greek soldiers. On the basin is a quote from United States President Woodrow Wilson: "The right is more precious than peace". On the base of the basin, lions' heads have been carved. On the last columns, huge vertical swords in relief can be admired. The monument contains many sculptures reminiscent of the style of Greek monuments of antiquity.

References

External links

World War I memorials in France
World War I memorials in the United States